Commonwealth Cosmos Football Club, nickname the Hyenas is a Singaporean semi-professional football club founded in 2014. It is based in Commonwealth, Singapore. The club enters the Football Association of Singapore lower division league, the Island Wide League in 2018 where they won the 3rd place. The following year in 2019 they won the title and gain promotion to 2020 Singapore Football League.

Honours
Singapore Island Wide League
Champions: 2019

References

 http://www.fas.org.sg/tiong-bahru-win-nfl-div-1-crown-commonwealth-cosmos-clinch-iwl-title/
 http://www.fas.org.sg/competition/island-wide-league/#results
 http://www.fas.org.sg/about-fas/fas-members/
 https://mycujoo.tv/en/club/commonwealth-cosmos-fc-1gj5ao
 http://www.fas.org.sg/minor_team/commonwealth-cosmos-fc/
 https://mofeye.com/how-to-become-a-national-player-in-singapore/

Football clubs in Singapore